Lunardelli is a municipality in the state of Paraná in the Southern Region of Brazil.

Its origins date from 1948, when the big land owner Geremina Lunardelli, one of the so-called Coffee Kings, bought three farms in the region in order to produce coffee.

See also
List of municipalities in Paraná

References

Municipalities in Paraná